Augustus P. Hunton (February 23, 1816 – June 20, 1911) was a Vermont lawyer and Senator. He served in the Vermont House of Representatives including three years as Speaker.  In addition, he served as President pro tempore of the Vermont State Senate.

Early life
Augustus Pingry Hunton was born in Groton, New Hampshire, on February 23, 1816.  He was raised in Hyde Park and Johnson, Vermont, studied law and was admitted to the bar in 1837.

Hunton practiced in Stockbridge, Bethel and Chelsea before settling permanently in Bethel in 1848.  Hunton usually practiced in conjunction with one other attorney, and one of his early partners was Governor Julius Converse.  In addition, Hunton was a relative of Samuel Pingree and Samuel's brother Stephen M. Pingree, both of whom studied law with Hunton before forming the Hartford firm of Pingree and Pingree.

Political career
Originally a Whig, he became a Republican when the party was organized in the mid-1850s.  Hunton represented Bethel in the Vermont House of Representatives In 1849, 1854, and 1859 to 1862.  From 1860 to 1862 Hunton served as Speaker.

From 1856 to 1857 Hunton represented Windsor County in the Vermont Senate, and in 1857 he served as the Senate's President pro tem.

During the Civil War Hunton was superintendent of Union Army recruiting for Windsor County.  In 1864 he was a delegate to the Republican National Convention.  After the war Hunton was a U.S. Pension Notary, responsible for verifying the documents presented by claimants before they were delivered to Vermont's U.S. Pension Agents.

Other activities
Hunton was a trustee of Norwich University from 1862 to 1867.  He was the recipient of honorary master's degrees from the University of Vermont in 1847 and Dartmouth College in 1859.

Death and burial
Hunton died in Bethel on June 20, 1911.  He was buried in Bethel's Cherry Hill Cemetery, of which he was an original incorporator.

Notes

1816 births
1911 deaths
People from Bethel, Vermont
People of Vermont in the American Civil War
Republican Party members of the Vermont House of Representatives
Vermont lawyers
Speakers of the Vermont House of Representatives
Republican Party Vermont state senators
Presidents pro tempore of the Vermont Senate
Norwich University
Burials in Vermont
19th-century American politicians
19th-century American lawyers